Victoria-La Vallée is a provincial electoral district for the Legislative Assembly of New Brunswick, Canada.

History
It was created in 1973 as Grand Falls.  Though its boundaries were unchanged in 1994, the name was changed to Grand Falls Region to reflect the fact that the district included not only the Town of Grand Falls but also the communities of Drummond and Saint-André.  The district underwent only slight boundary changes in 2006 but the name was again changed to the less unusual and more easily bilingual Grand Falls-Drummond-Saint-André.

In the 2013 redistribution the riding expanded significantly as it was nearly 30% underpopulated.  It moved south taking in parts of Victoria County north of the Aroostook River and north taking in the areas around and including the Town of St-Leonard.

Members of the Legislative Assembly

Election results

Victoria-La Vallée

Grand Falls-Drummond-Saint André

Grand Falls Region

Grand Falls

References

External links 
Website of the Legislative Assembly of New Brunswick
Map of riding as of 2018

Grand Falls, New Brunswick
New Brunswick provincial electoral districts